National Command Authority may refer to:

 National Command Authority (Pakistan)
 National Command Authority (United States)